Inaki Axel Echeverría Stefanski (born 19 March 1980) is a Spanish-German politician of the Social Democratic Party (SPD) who has been serving as a member of the Bundestag since 2021.

Early life and education
Echeverria was born in 1980 in the West German town of Witten. From 2019 to 2021, he worked at the Federal Employment Agency.

Political career
Echeverria was elected directly to the Bundestag in 2021, representing the Ennepe-Ruhr-Kreis II district. In parliament, he has been serving on the Committee on Petitions, the Committee on the Environment, Nature Conservation, Nuclear Safety and Consumer Protection, and the Parliamentary Advisory Board on Sustainable Development.

Within his parliamentary group, Echeverria is part of a working group on migration and integration. He also belongs to the Parliamentary Left, a left-wing movement within the group.

References 

Living people
1980 births
Social Democratic Party of Germany politicians
Members of the Bundestag 2021–2025
21st-century German politicians
People from Witten